Walkin' Bank Roll is the fifth studio album by American rapper Project Pat. It was released on October 30, 2007, via Hypnotize Minds/Koch Records. In the album's last song, "Outro", Juicy J informs the listener that the record was originally called Gimme Me but was later changed to Walkin' Bank Roll to reduce confusion. Walkin' Bank Roll debuted at number 47 on the Billboard 200.

Along with the single, a music video was released for "Don't Call Me No Mo'" on October 10, 2007.

Track listing

Chart history

References

2007 albums
Project Pat albums
Albums produced by DJ Paul
Albums produced by Juicy J
E1 Music albums